Bega is a small village belonging to the municipality of Dörentrup in Lippe district, Nordrhein-Westfalen, Germany.

Its name comes from the river Bega, that crosses the village. It has 1392 inhabitants.

References 

Lippe
Principality of Lippe